Muscatine Community College (MCC) is a public community college in Muscatine, Iowa. Founded in 1929, MCC is the oldest college in the Eastern Iowa Community Colleges that also includes Clinton Community College and Scott Community College. The college offers both arts and sciences/college transfer classes as well as several career technology programs. Its fall enrollment regularly exceeds 1,850 students.

The Muscatine Community College Foundation was founded in 1961 to support the college's educational programs, student and staff development, facilities improvement and alumni development. Its emphasis is on student scholarships and loans, with more than $230,000 awarded annually to MCC students for tuition, fees and books.

External links
Official website

Community colleges in Iowa
Educational institutions established in 1929
Education in Muscatine County, Iowa
Buildings and structures in Muscatine, Iowa
1929 establishments in Iowa